Arthur Kenny (9 August 1878 – 2 August 1934) was an Australian cricketer. He played twelve first-class cricket matches for Victoria between 1910 and 1911.

See also
 List of Victoria first-class cricketers

References

External links
 

1878 births
1934 deaths
Australian cricketers
Victoria cricketers
Cricketers from Melbourne